The Council for the Australian Federation (CAF) was established on 6 October 2006. The group seeks to promote and enhance the federal system of government in Australia and comprises Premiers and Chief Ministers of all Australian states and territories.

The idea for the Council was originally advocated by the former Victorian Premier Steve Bracks and former South Australian Premier Mike Rann. They had been impressed by a meeting of Canada's Council of the Federation chaired by Quebec's Premier Jean Charest which they attended, along with Queensland's Anna Bligh, in Montreal earlier in 2006.  Rann became the inaugural Chair.  In its February 2007 meeting it issued the CAF Declaration on Climate Change.  It undertook substantial policy work and modelling on emissions trading and in April 2007 CAF commissioned eminent Australian academic Professor Ross Garnaut to review the likely impact of climate change on the Australian economy and to make recommendations on medium and long term policies to deal with that impact.

The second meeting of the CAF was held on 9 February 2007 in Sydney and the third meeting was conducted on 12 April 2007.  The current chair is New South Wales Premier, Dominic Perrottet.

The Council for the Australian Federation aims to strategically shape the national policy agenda and provide a forum for political actions. Issues that have been addressed include the National Emissions Trading Taskforce, implementation of the National Reform Agenda and the drought in Australia.  The Council funds research and releases reports on topics related to its mission and activities.

See also

Council of Australian Governments
Council of the Federation

References

External links
CAF

2006 establishments in Australia
Federalism in Australia
Government of Australia